The Richmond Parkway Transit Center or RPTC is a park and ride lot and bus terminal located in Richmond, California. It is named after the adjacent Richmond Parkway. It serves as a transfer point for the WestCAT and AC Transit. It is located on the corner of Richmond Parkway and Blume Drive near the Pinole border and adjacent to Interstate 80 and the Hilltop Plaza shopping center.

Bus service
The following bus services stop at the center:

AC Transit
 70 - Appian/Rheem to Richmond BART
 71 - Carlson/Birmingham Drive to El Cerrito Plaza BART
 376 - North Richmond (Nighttime only)
 LA - Hilltop to San Francisco (commute trips only)

WestCAT
 16 - Pinole
 17 - Bayview
 18 - Tara Hills
 19 - Hilltop/Hercules (Saturday service only)
 30Z - Richmond Parkway - Martinez Amtrak Station half of trips are interlines with JPX. 
 JPX - Del Norte BART-Hercules via Pinole Valley Road (some buses continue as/from Route 30Z to Martinez)
 JR - Del Norte BART-Hercules via Richmond Parkway & Blume Drive

Transit Village
As reported in 2006, in the East Bay newspaper the East Bay Express, there are plans to build a transit village at or adjacent to the site. Its purpose is as smart growth and to encourage transit use. It is modeled on the Fruitvale Model (Fruitvale Transit Village) at the Fruitvale BART station in Oakland, California. It is one of many similar projects surrounding BART & Caltrain stations, regional ferry terminals, and Park & Ride lots & Transit Centers to reduce sprawl and traffic.

Planning
In 2016 an ultra light rail service was proposed and supported by the Richmond City Council to connect the center with the city's waterfront (Marina Bay).
In 2017 the Metropolitan Transportation Commission mulled expanded parking here to address projected double digit traffic growth in the area through 2040.

It has also been studied as a potential location for a future BART station extension along the Richmond–Warm Springs/South Fremont line.

Notes

External links 
AC Transit improvement study for RPTC
 Transit and parking information at Transit Unlimited

Bus stations in Contra Costa County, California
Buildings and structures in Richmond, California
Bus stations in the San Francisco Bay Area